Turkmenistan is scheduled to compete in the 2017 Asian Winter Games in Sapporo and Obihiro, Japan from February 19 to 26. This will mark the country's debut at the Asian Winter Games. The country is scheduled to compete in one sport: ice hockey.

Background
Turkmenistan originally had intended to make its debut at the 2007 Asian Winter Games in Changchun, China, however its athlete was not allowed to compete officially, as the country was not an official member of the International Skating Union at the time.

Competitors
The following table lists the Turkmenistani delegation per sport and gender.

Ice hockey

Turkmenistan has entered a men's hockey team. The team is scheduled to compete in division 2. This will mark the country's debut in the sport at the Asian Winter Games. Before the tournament, the team had a training camp in Minsk, Belarus, and won both friendly games against local club teams. Turkmenistan finished in first place (11th place overall) in division 2 of the competition.

Men's tournament

Turkmenistan was represented by the following 23 athletes:

Keremli Charyyev (G)
Rahman Muratov (G)
Amangeldi Aganiyazov (D)
Shyhy Babayev (D)
Kerim Bayramov (D)
Evald Gayer (D)
Dovlet Hydyrov (D)
Dmitriy Savin (A) (D)
Nikita Selifonkin (D)
Ilyas Veliyev (A) (D)
Ezizmuhammet Akmuhammedov (F)
Maksat Atayev (F)
Pavel Barkovskiy (F)
Baymyrat Baymyradov (F)
Azat Berdinyyazov (F)
Yakut Berdiyev (F)
Ahmet Gurbanov (C) (F)
Meylis Kuliyev (F)
Mammet Myrado (F)
Nurmammet Nuryyev (F)
Dovlet Soyunov (F)
Aleksandr Vahovskiy (F)
Ishan Veleyev (F)

Legend: G = Goalie, D = Defense, F = Forward, C = Captain, A = Assistant captain
Group B

11th place match

References

Nations at the 2017 Asian Winter Games
Asian Winter Games
Turkmenistan at the Asian Winter Games